John Barbour may refer to:

 John Barbour (poet) (1316–1395), Scottish poet
 John Barbour (MP for New Shoreham), MP for New Shoreham 1368–1382
 John Barbour (footballer) (1890–1916), Scottish footballer
 John S. Barbour (1790–1855), U.S. congressman from Virginia
 John S. Barbour Jr. (1820–1892), his son, also a politician from Virginia
 John Strode Barbour (1866–1952), American newspaper editor, lawyer, mayor, and statesman
 John Barbour (actor) (born 1933), Canadian-born broadcaster and television personality in the United States
 Sir Milne Barbour (John Milne Barbour, 1868–1951), Northern Irish politician
 John Barbour, namesake of J. Barbour and Sons, a British manufacturer of outerwear
 John Baxter Barbour Jr. (1862–1929), president of Pittsburgh Stock Exchange
 John Doherty Barbour (1824–1901), Irish industrialist and politician
 John C. Barbour (1895–1962), American politician in New Jersey

See also
 John Strode Barbour (disambiguation)